American singer Lindsay Lohan has released two studio albums and six singles. After acting in films The Parent Trap (1998), Freaky Friday (2003), and Mean Girls (2004), Lohan began recording songs for the soundtracks to her films. In September 2002, Emilio Estefan, Jr. signed Lohan to a five-album contract. The deal was later scrapped and Lohan signed on to Casablanca Records in 2004, under the management of Tommy Mottola. Speak, her debut album, was released in December 2004. The record peaked at number 4 on the Billboard 200 and eventually earning Platinum certification. Speak spawned Lohan's first single, "Rumors". "Rumors" eventually earned gold certification, as well as a nomination for Best Pop Video at the 2005 MTV Video Music Awards.

Lohan's second album, A Little More Personal (Raw), was released in December 2005. The album peaked at number 20 on the Billboard 200, gaining gold certification in early 2006. The first and only single from the album, "Confessions of a Broken Heart (Daughter to Father)", peaked at number 57 on the Billboard Hot 100, making it Lohan's first single to debut on the chart. In 2007, Lohan commenced work on a third album following a move to the Universal Motown label. A promotional single, "Bossy", released in May 2008, was written by Ne-Yo and Stargate. The album was initially due for release in late 2008, however, Lohan announced in November 2008 that work on the album had stalled. In 2010, it was believed that she might still be recording an album after the long wait. In July 2019, it was announced that Lohan was working on new music with Universal Republic's Casablanca Records again, and teased the track "Xanax" on social media. The single "Back to Me" was then released on April 3, 2020.

Studio albums

Singles

Promotional singles

Other appearances

Notes

References

Discographies of American artists
Discography
Pop music discographies